John Hollingworth (born 21 August 1981) is an English actor from Keighley, Bradford, West Yorkshire.

Early life and education

Hollingworth was raised in Oxenhope, Keighley, Bradford, by his mother Jane. He studied at Bradford Grammar School, Trinity College, Dublin and University of California, Los Angeles. While at Bradford Grammar School he played rugby for Yorkshire Schoolboys, and played in the same team as future England and British and Irish Lions international Charlie Hodgson, before injury forced Hollingworth to hang up his boots and become an actor. He trained as an actor at RADA.

Radio roles

Hollingworth was runner-up in the BBC SoundStart Carleton Hobbs Bursary Award in 2008.

He appeared with Damian Lewis in series four and five of the BBC Radio 4 drama series Number 10. Other work for Radio 4 includes the comedies Deadheading and Modesty Blaise, both of which have 5 episodes each. He has often played multiple characters in the same production.

Stage roles

Hollingworth has worked extensively on stage, which include leading roles in Making Noise Quietly, Our Country's Good, An Intervention and Earthquakes in London.

In February and March 2011, he starred opposite Maxine Peake in The Deep Blue Sea at the West Yorkshire Playhouse.

He had roles National Youth Theatre productions of The Life and Adventures of Nicholas Nickleby, The Threepenny Opera and The Master and Margarita opposite Matt Smith.

Some of his other theatre credits include Women, Power and Politics at the Tricycle theatre, For King and Country at the Theatre Royal, Plymouth, The Playboy of the Western World at the Nuffield Theatre (Southampton), Ignition 2 at the Royal Court Upstairs, The Power of Yes at the National Theatre, Design for Living at the Old Vic and Observe the Sons of Ulster Marching Towards the Somme at the Hampstead Theatre.

His portrayal of Nick Clegg at the Tricycle Theatre caught the attention of fellow Keighley born Alastair Campbell.

Film roles

Hollingworth appeared in the 2009 film Dorian Gray.

In 2010 he appeared in Pelican Blood and "Godard and Others".

In 2011 he appeared in The Burma Conspiracy.

In 2012 he appeared in The Dark Knight Rises.

In 2016 he appeared in The Legend of Tarzan.

In 2017 he played Tristan in Transformers: The Last Knight.

In 2018 he voiced Ryszard Kapuściński in the animated war film Another Day of Life, which is based on Ryszard's memoir of the same name. He also played Bruce Hamil Lt in Kursk alongside Colin Firth.

In 2019 he played Sergeant Guthrie in 1917.

Television roles

Hollingworth played Robert in the 2009 ITV miniseries Wuthering Heights, alongside Tom Hardy and Charlotte Riley. He also briefly appeared in the Casualty spin-off Casualty 1909, and Being Human with his future co-star Aidan Turner.

In 2011 he played Max Furst in the BBC TV film The Man Who Crossed Hitler. He also appeared in the Channel 4 TV film London's Burning, and the BBC series Twenty Twelve.

In 2012 he played Alastair in the second series of The Hour.

In 2013 he appeared in the ITV shows Endeavour and Breathless.

In 2014 he played Francesco Sassetti in the second series of Da Vinci's Demons. He also played Lawrence Baxendale in Crossing Lines, and Lieutenant Cohen in Our World War.

In 2015 he played Dr Butter in the 3 part ITV series Arthur & George He played Peterson in the BBC sitcom Top Coppers. He guest starred as Teabag in Josh Widdicombe's sitcom Josh. He played regular character Captain Henshawe in the BBC adaptation of Poldark between 2015 and 2017.

In 2016 he played Dr John Maling in the ITV period drama Dark Angel. He also played Brin Dunne in series 18, of the ITV series Midsomer Murders, in the episode titled "A Dying Art". He played Detective Wallace in the BBC docudrama film Damilola, Our Loved Boy.

In 2017 he started his regular role as Professor Sam Bradman, in the ITV series Doc Martin.

In 2019, he played Mr Abbott in the BBC and HBO co-production Gentleman Jack, Lord Porchester in the Netflix series The Crown, and PC Shawn Turnley in the ITV detective drama Vera.

In 2020, Hollingworth appeared in the Netflix miniseries The Queen's Gambit.

Other work

Hollingworth plays the band manager in the music video for The Futureheads' single "Walking Backwards". An award-winning student journalist, he has written occasional pieces about acting. His short plays have been performed in London at the Arcola, Soho Theatre and Tristan Bates Theatre. His first full-length play Multitudes which is set in the City of Bradford, was performed at the Tricycle Theatre in February 2015, directed by artistic director Indhu Rubasingham. In 2018, Hollingworth wrote "Songs for the Seven Hills" for Sheffield Theatres for their community company The Sheffield People's Theatre.

References

External links
 

British male actors
Male actors from Bradford
People from Keighley
Living people
Alumni of RADA
British dramatists and playwrights
1981 births